Ashina Anluo (Sogdian: wmn’ x’γ’n, trad. 阿史那庵邏 ;simp. 阿史那庵逻) was the fifth ruler of the Turkic Khaganate. in the sixth century. His regnal title is not recorded in Chinese sources.

Reign 
Although he was enthroned after his father's death in 581, soon his cousin Talopien (Mukan Khagan's son) rebelled claiming that Taspar willed the title to him. Another cousin Shetu (Issik Khagan's son) however supported Amrak. Amrak, being the least powerful of the three abandoned and renounced his title in favor of Shetu. In turn Shetu (regnal title Ishbara) declared him a lesser khagan in Tuul River valley (now in Mongolia).(See Göktürk civil war)

References

Ashina house of the Turkic Empire
Year of birth unknown
Göktürk khagans